The 2018 National Pro Fastpitch season was the 15th season of professional softball under the name National Pro Fastpitch (NPF) for the only professional women's softball league in the United States.  From 1997 to 2002, NPF operated under the names Women's Pro Fastpitch (WPF) and Women's Pro Softball League (WPSL). Each year, the playoff teams battle for the Cowles Cup.

Milestones and events

On October 12, 2017, it was reported the Texas Charge would be dissolving, effective immediately.  The NPF did not make an announcement regarding the Charge, but all Charge players under contract were added to the league's transactions page as free agents.

In an arrangement similar to the Beijing Eagles', NPF announced in December 2017 that Softball Australia would be operating a 2018 expansion team, the Aussie Spirit.

On January 28, 2018, the Scrap Yard Dawgs announced via press release they would no longer be affiliated with the NPF.  They indicated they would continue as an independent team.
On the same day, Ohio.com reported that the Akron Racers would be replaced by a Chinese team, similar to the Beijing Eagles.

Rule changes

Teams, cities and stadiums

Player acquisition

College draft

The 2018 NPF College Draft will be the 13th annual collegiate draft for NPF.

Notable transactions

Head Coaching Changes
 The Bandits announced that coach Sharonda McDonald would not be returning for the 2018 season.  On September 19, they announced that their new coach would be Olympian medalist and NCAA champion  Stacey Nuveman Deniz.  Nuveman Deniz held the NCAA home run record of 90 from 2002 to 2015, when Lauren Chamberlain broke it.  She played in the NPF for the Arizona Heat in 2005.

League standings

Results table

NPF Championship

Championship Game

Statistical leaders

Players of the Week

Annual awards

All-NPF Team

Notes

See also 

 List of professional sports leagues
 List of professional sports teams in the United States and Canada

References

External links 
 

Softball teams
Softball in the United States
National Pro Fastpitch season
National Pro Fastpitch season